Andy Stewart may refer to:

 Andy Stewart (Australian footballer) (1876–1919), Australian rules footballer
 Andy Stewart (musician) (1933–1993), Scottish singer, songwriter, and entertainer
 Andy Stewart (politician) (1937–2013), British MP for Sherwood, 1983–1992
 Andy M. Stewart (1952–2015), Scottish musician and songwriter, best known for fronting the Scottish folk band Silly Wizard
 Andy Stewart (baseball) (born 1970), Canadian Olympic baseball and former major league catcher
 Andy Stewart (Scottish footballer) (born 1978), Scottish football goalkeeper
 Andy Stewart (basketball), Australian basketball coach

See also 
 Andrew Stewart (disambiguation)
 Andrew Stuart (disambiguation)